The 1977 Khurgu earthquake struck southern Iran near Bandar Abbas in Hormozgan province on the morning of March 22. Thirty five villages were heavily damaged including over 20 which were destroyed. There were 152–167 people killed and 556 injured.

Tectonic setting
The Zagros Mountains extends southeast from Turkey to the Gulf of Oman for ~, representing a convergent boundary. They are part of the Alpine orogeny, and is the youngest continental collision zone in the world. Collision occurs between Arabia and central Iran began in the late Eocene after the subduction of the Neotethys Ocean ceased. The Zagros region accommodates nearly half the current convergence rate between Arabia and Iran. In the east–west trending southeastern Zagros, the convergence rate is fastest (~/yr), and accommodated by crustal shortening. In the central and northwestern Zagros, its strike changes to northwest–southeast. Here, convergence is oblique and occur at ~/yr.

Earthquake
The earthquake was the result of shallow thrust faulting on either a north or south dipping fault as indicated by its focal mechanism. This region hosts active faults that form the Zagros fold and thrust belt. It had an epicenter located beneath an anticline in the southeastern Zagros. Steeply-dipping blind thrust faults in the area inferred from topographic and stratigraphic studies were likely responsible for earthquakes in the southeastern Zagros. The Mountain Front Fault was associated with the event, together with a historical earthquake in 1052 CE and many smaller instrumentally recorded earthquakes. Other faults there were inferred included the Dezful Embayment, Zagros Foredeep, Surmeh, Lar and Beriz-Dehkuyeh faults. The High Zagros Fault was the only mapped fault because it ruptured the surface. The Zagros Foredeep and Mountain Front faults are located at the frontal region of the range and runs parallel to them.

Impact
The death toll was moderate (152–167 killed out of a population of 11,117) due to the occurrence of a strong foreshock that was widely felt. The foreshock acted as a warning sign to residents. Many were awaken by the foreshock and rushed out of their homes before the mainshock struck. The time interval between the foreshock and mainshock was estimated to be 10–15 seconds. This helped reduce the number of fatalities. Many casualties were the seniors and children who were unable to respond to the foreshock. There were no reported casualties in Bandar Abbas.

A  area was devastated. More than 1,500 homes were heavily damaged. Buildings in the epicenter region are constructed with traditional designs with minimal variations. Schools and elevated water tank were constructed better. Building materials mainly consists of clay bricks, stones and mud. Structural failures initiated at corners before progressing to the walls, causing roofs to collapse. Strong ground motion only persisted for a short time as most failures were incomplete. Damage to supporting columns in buildings suggest the earthquake produced large vertical ground motions. This was further supported by overturned stones found near an affected village. A road connecting Bandar Abbas to Kerman had minor damage. A crack formed on the tunnel wall while at a bridge, minor cracks were observed. Near the tunnel, ground lurching was reported. 

Buildings in the city were recently constructed and designed to resist seismic events. Damage was extensive at the Gameron Hotel, where a wing was severely cracked. Many guests panicked and rushed to exit the hotel. At the city airport, hairline cracks developed in concrete columns and tiles fell. Due to the increased urban development in this earthquake-prone area, seismic instruments in the city recorded ground motions from the earthquake. The earthquake was also felt on Kish island where the Shah was residing at. Aircraft from Tehran flew into Bandar Abbas to bring relief supplies. Iran Air performed emergency flights to ferry tourists out of Bandar Abbas.

See also
List of earthquakes in 1977
List of earthquakes in Iran

References

1977 earthquakes
Earthquakes in Iran
1977 in Iran
March 1977 events in Asia
History of Hormozgan Province